Majken Grethe Vange (later Hildebrand, born 29 September 1975) is a retired female badminton player from Denmark.

Career
She won a bronze medal at the 1999 IBF World Championships in women's doubles with Ann-Lou Jørgensen; they also competed at the 2000 Summer Olympics.

References

External links
European results
Results 1992-2003
World Championships

Danish female badminton players
Living people
1975 births
Olympic badminton players of Denmark
Badminton players at the 2000 Summer Olympics